Sir Bernard Carl Ashwin  (22 September 1896 – 12 February 1975) was a New Zealand senior public servant and economist. He was born in Paeroa, New Zealand, on 22 September 1896.

Ashwin was appointed a Companion of the Order of St Michael and St George in the 1946 New Year Honours. In 1953, he was awarded the Queen Elizabeth II Coronation Medal. In the 1956 Queen's Birthday Honours, he was appointed a Knight Commander of the Order of the British Empire.

References

1896 births
1975 deaths
New Zealand public servants
People from Paeroa
New Zealand Companions of the Order of St Michael and St George
New Zealand Knights Commander of the Order of the British Empire